Corina is a given name.

Corina may also refer to:

 Corina (album), a 1991 album by the Latin singer Corina
 Corina (Romanian singer) or Corina Monica Ciorbă (born 1980), Romanian singer
 Corina (American singer) or Corina Katt Ayala, American singer
 Corina (Belgian singer)
 Corina or Kulina language of Brazil and Peru

See also
 Corin
 Corine (disambiguation)
 Corinna (disambiguation)
 Corinne (disambiguation)
 Corrina
 Carina (name)